Dombey and Son is a 1969 English drama serial directed by Joan Craft based on the 1848 novel by Charles Dickens. It tells the story of a wealthy shipping business owner who, after the death of his wife and only son intended to take over the business, neglects his daughter, only to reconcile with her shortly before his own death.

The series survived the BBC's wiping policy and was released to DVD in 2017 by Simply Media.

Cast 
 John Carson - Mr. Dombey
 Kara Wilson - Florence Dombey
 William Moore - Captain Cuttle
 Chris Sandford - Mr. Toots
 Helen Fraser - Susan Nipper
 Sally Home - Edith Dombey & Alice Marwood
 Gary Raymond - James Carker
 Pat Coombs - Lucretia Tox
 Edward Topps - Towlinson
 Fay Compton - Mrs. Brown
 David Garth - John Carker
 Derek Seaton - Walter Gay
 Clive Swift - Major Bagstock
 Roland Pickering - Paul Dombey Jr.
 Victoria Williams - Young Florence

Archive status
Unusual for a black and white BBC series produced in the 1960s, three of the thirteen episodes of Dombey (1, 4 and 6) still exist as their original 625 line videotape masters, whilst the remaining ten episodes had their videotapes erased in the 1970s. All of the wiped episodes survived, however, as 16mm telerecordings. All episodes have high sound and picture quality, with little-to-no visible damage on the DVD release.

Critical reception
The serial has received positive reviews, with some deeming it an improvement over the novel. Reviewing its DVD release, Archive Television Musings wrote "Hugh Leonard’s adaptation manages to skillfully fillet Dickens’ novel and thereby retain everything of interest. A fine rogues gallery of comic performers – headed by the peerless William Moore as Captain Cuttle – helps to keep things ticking along nicely...[Joan Craft's] directorial style isn’t dramatic or showy (there’s few of the flourishes that can be seen in Alan Bridges’ Great Expectations) but she still manages to ensure that the story unfolds at a decent pace...Thanks to the first-class cast who rarely put a foot wrong, Dombey & Son is another impressive Dickens adaptation.  Highly recommended."

References

External links 

1969 drama films
1969 films
1960s British television miniseries
Television shows based on works by Charles Dickens
British television films
1960s English-language films